A bonus clause is a clause in a contract that rewards the contractor for doing more than the letter of the contract; particularly, to finish the job early. It is in apposition to a penalty clause where the contractor loses by providing less than the letter of the contract, or providing it later than agreed.

The aim of a bonus clause is to give a win-win situation whereby the contractor wins by getting more money for finishing early, and the holder of the contract wins by having a product earlier to market.

Contract law